Udyanaya Grama Niladhari Division is a  Grama Niladhari Division of the  Dehiwala Divisional Secretariat  of Colombo District  of Western Province, Sri Lanka .  It has Grama Niladhari Division Code 536A.

National Zoological Gardens of Sri Lanka is located within, nearby or associated with Udyanaya.

Udyanaya is a surrounded by the  Dehiwala East, Kalubovila, Karagampitiya, Nedimala, Kawdana East, Malwatta and Galwala  Grama Niladhari Divisions.

Demographics

Ethnicity 

The Udyanaya Grama Niladhari Division has  a Sinhalese majority (71.1%) and a significant Moor population (21.2%) . In comparison, the Dehiwala Divisional Secretariat (which contains the Udyanaya Grama Niladhari Division) has  a Sinhalese majority (60.5%), a significant Moor population (20.8%) and a significant Sri Lankan Tamil population (14.5%)

Religion 

The Udyanaya Grama Niladhari Division has  a Buddhist majority (67.8%) and a significant Muslim population (22.4%) . In comparison, the Dehiwala Divisional Secretariat (which contains the Udyanaya Grama Niladhari Division) has  a Buddhist majority (54.3%), a significant Muslim population (22.6%) and a significant Hindu population (12.1%)

Gallery

References 

Colombo District
Grama Niladhari divisions of Sri Lanka